Leopoldius is a genus of flies from the family Conopidae.

Species
L. brevirostris (Germar, 1827)
L. cabrilsensis Carles-Tolrá, 2000
L. calceatus (Rondani, 1857)
L. coronatus (Rondani, 1857)
L. diadematus Rondani, 1845
L. signatus (Wiedemann in Meigen, 1824)
L. valvatus Kröber, 1914

References

Conopidae
Conopoidea genera
Taxa named by Camillo Rondani